Cumberland County Courthouse is a historic courthouse building located at Fayetteville, Cumberland County, North Carolina. It was designed by architect Harry Barton and built in 1925–1926.  It is a three-story, rectangular, Classical Revival style building sheathed in ashlar veneer.

It was listed on the National Register of Historic Places in 1979.

References

County courthouses in North Carolina
Courthouses on the National Register of Historic Places in North Carolina
Neoclassical architecture in North Carolina
Government buildings completed in 1926
Buildings and structures in Fayetteville, North Carolina
National Register of Historic Places in Cumberland County, North Carolina